George Strutt may refer to:

 George Henry Strutt (1826–1895), English cotton manufacturer and philanthropist
 George Herbert Strutt (1854–1928), English cotton mill owner and philanthropist